Marmite is a British savoury food spread based on yeast extract, invented by the German scientist Justus von Liebig. It is made from by-products of beer brewing (lees) and is produced by the British company Unilever. Marmite is a vegan source of B vitamins, including supplemental vitamin B12. A traditional method of use is to spread it very thinly on buttered toast.

Marmite is a sticky, dark brown paste with a distinctive, salty, powerful flavour and heady aroma. This distinctive taste is represented in the marketing slogan: "Love it or hate it." Such is its prominence in British popular culture that Marmite is often used as a metaphor for something that is an acquired taste or polarises opinion. Marmite is commonly used as a flavouring, as it is particularly rich in umami due to its very high levels of glutamate (1960 mg/100 g).

The image on the jar shows a marmite, a French term for a large, covered earthenware or metal cooking pot. Marmite was originally supplied in earthenware pots but since the 1920s has been sold in glass jars. Marmite's distinctive bulbous jars are supplied to Unilever by the German glass manufacturer Gerresheimer.

Similar products include the Australian Vegemite (whose name is derived from that of Marmite), the Swiss Cenovis, the Brazilian Cenovit, the long-extinct Argentinian Condibé, and the German Vitam-R. Marmite in New Zealand has been manufactured since 1919 under licence, but with a different recipe; it is the only one sold as Marmite in Australasia and the Pacific Islands, whereas elsewhere the British version predominates.

History
The product that was to become Marmite was invented during the late 19th century when the German scientist Justus von Liebig discovered that brewer's yeast could be concentrated, bottled and eaten. During 1902, the Marmite Food Extract Company was formed in Burton upon Trent, Staffordshire, England with Marmite as its main product and Burton as the site of the first factory. The by-product yeast needed for the paste was supplied by Bass Brewery. By 1907, the product had become successful enough to warrant construction of a second factory at Camberwell Green in London.

By 1912, the discovery of vitamins was a boost for Marmite, as the spread is a rich source of the vitamin B complex;
with the vitamin B1 deficiency beriberi being common during World War I, the spread became more popular. British troops during World War I were issued Marmite as part of their rations.

During the 1930s, Marmite was used by the English scientist Lucy Wills to successfully treat a form of anaemia in mill workers in Bombay. She later identified folic acid as the active ingredient. Marmite was used to treat malnutrition by Suriya-Mal workers during the 1934–5 malaria epidemic in Sri Lanka. Housewives were encouraged to spread Marmite thinly and to "use it sparingly just now" because of limited rations of the product.

During 1990, Marmite Limited, which had become a subsidiary of Bovril Limited, was bought by CPC International Inc, which changed its name to Best Foods Inc during 1998. Best Foods Inc subsequently merged with Unilever during 2000, and Marmite is now a trademark owned by Unilever.

Similar products
There are a number of similar yeast products available in other countries; these products are not directly connected to the original Marmite recipe and brand. The Australian product Vegemite was developed in early 1920s by Cyril Callister for Fred Walker and Co. due to shortages of Marmite exports to Australia as a result of the First World War. It is now distributed in many countries, and AussieMite is sold in Australia. Other products include OzeMite, which is made by Dick Smith Foods; Cenovit, a Brazilian spread; Vitam-R, a German spread; Cenovis, a Swiss spread; and Vegex, an autolyzed yeast product available in the United States since 1913. In the United Kingdom, own-branded yeast extract, very similar to Marmite, is sold by Sainsbury's, Tesco and Aldi.

Usage
Marmite has traditionally been eaten as a savoury spread on bread, toast, savoury biscuits or crackers, and other similar baked products. Owing to its concentrated taste, it is often spread very thinly in combination with butter or margarine. It can be made into a savoury hot drink by adding one teaspoon to a mug of hot water, much like Oxo or Bovril. It is also commonly used to enrich casseroles and stews.

Marmite is often paired with cheese—for example, in a cheese sandwich or a cheese-flavoured biscuit such as Mini Cheddars. In the UK, Starbucks offers a cheese and Marmite panini. There are Marmite-flavored varieties of Walkers Crisps, and of some brands of rice cakes and biscuits.

Marmite has also been used as an ingredient in cocktails, including the Marmite Cocktail and the Marmite Gold Rush.

Celebrity chefs have created signature Marmite-flavored recipes: Nigella Lawson has one for Marmite spaghetti, and Heston Blumenthal has one for Marmite consommé.

In 2020, Marmite launched a campaign on Instagram—“The Great Marmite Experiment”—-encouraging people to share their Marmite-flavored recipes. The many entries in response included roast potatoes, beef Wellington and cookies.

In Malaysia, Singapore and Hong Kong, Marmite is enjoyed stirred into congee (rice porridge), and in an intensely savory Malaysian dish (local Chinese dish) called Marmite Chicken, consisting of fried pieces of chicken tossed in a Marmite sauce.

Manufacture
While the process is secret, the general method for making yeast extract on a commercial scale is to add salt to a suspension of yeast, making the solution hypertonic, which results in the cells shrivelling; this triggers autolysis, during which the yeast self-destructs. The dying yeast cells are then heated to complete their breakdown, and since yeast cells have thick cell walls which would detract from the smoothness of the end product, the husks are sieved out. As with other yeast extracts, Marmite contains free glutamic acid, the monosodium salt of which being monosodium glutamate.

Currently, the main ingredients of Marmite are glutamic acid-rich yeast extract, with lesser quantities of salt, vegetable extract, spice extracts and celery extracts, although the precise composition is a trade secret. Vitamins added for food fortification include riboflavin, folic acid, and Vitamin B12. Vitamin B12 is not naturally found in yeast extract, but is very important for vegans who are at risk of deficiency.

Nutritional information

Marmite is rich in B vitamins including thiamin (B1), riboflavin (B2), niacin (B3), and folic acid (B9). Vitamin B12 is only available through artificial enrichment; riboflavin and folic acid are added on top of the naturally-occurring amount. The sodium content of the spread is high and has caused concern, although it is the amount per serving rather than the percentage in bulk Marmite that is relevant. The main ingredient of Marmite is yeast extract, which contains a high concentration of glutamic acid. Marmite is not gluten-free, as it is made with wheat, and although it is thoroughly washed, it may contain small quantities of gluten.

Marmite should be avoided if a person takes a MAOI antidepressant, such as phenelzine (Nardil) or tranylcypromine (Parnate), as yeast extracts interact adversely with these types of medications due to their tyramine content.

Storage
Marmite should be stored in the dark and kept cool, but should not be refrigerated. The "best before" date is given as guidance for the loss of vitamins rather than safety.

Marketing

Marmite's publicity campaigns initially emphasised the spread's healthy nature, extolling it as "The growing up spread you never grow out of". The first major Marmite advertising campaign began during the 1930s, with characters whose faces incorporated the word "good". Soon afterwards, the increasing awareness of vitamins was used in Marmite advertising, with slogans proclaiming that "A small quantity added to the daily diet will ensure you and your family are taking sufficient vitamin B to keep nerves, brain, and digestion in proper working order".

During the 1980s, the spread was advertised with the slogan "My mate, Marmite", chanted in television commercials by an army platoon. The spread had been a standard vitamin supplement for British-based German POWs during the Second World War.

By the 1990s Marmite's distinctive and powerful flavour had earned it as many detractors as it had fans, and it was known for producing a polarised "love/hate" reaction amongst consumers. For many years television advertisements for Marmite featured the song "Low Rider" by the band War with the lyrics changed to the phrase "My Mate, Marmite". Marmite began a "Love it or Hate it" campaign during October 1996, and this resulted in the inventing of the phrase "Marmite effect" or "Marmite reaction" for anything which provoked controversy. On 22 April 2010, Unilever threatened legal action against the British National Party for using a jar of Marmite and the "love it or hate it" slogan in a party political broadcast.

Availability worldwide

Because of the local product named Marmite, European Marmite is sold by the name "Our Mate" in Australia and New Zealand. New Zealand Marmite uses the name "NZ-Mite" elsewhere. A similar product with the same name, albeit manufactured by Sanitarium is available in Australia and New Zealand.

Denmark 

In Denmark, food safety legislation dictates that foodstuffs that contain added vitamins can only be sold by retailers which have been licensed by the Veterinary and Food Administration. During May 2011, the company that imports the product to Denmark revealed that it was not licensed and had therefore stopped selling the product: this resulted in widespread but inaccurate reports by the British media that Marmite had been banned by the Danish authorities. The Danish Veterinary and Food Administration stated during 2015 that Marmite had not been banned in the country, but that fortified foods need to be tested for safety and approved before they can be marketed in the country. The issue was resolved in 2016, after the completion of a 2014 supplier-requested test.

Canada
On 24 January 2014, the Canadian Food Inspection Agency was noted, in a Canadian Broadcasting Corporation story, as preparing to stop the sale of Marmite, as well as Vegemite and Ovaltine, in Canada because they were enriched with vitamins and minerals which were not listed by Canadian food regulations. The agency said the products were not a health hazard.
The CFIA later specified that these specific items had been seized because they were not the versions that are formulated for sale in Canada and which satisfied all Canadian food regulations. Canadian versions of Marmite and the other products would still be permitted to be sold in Canada.

South Africa
Marmite is manufactured by licence in South Africa by Pioneer Foods in its traditional form.

South Africa also produces a bottled, long-life Marmite-flavoured cheese spread. It is light in texture and contains a hint of Marmite.

Special editions

During 2002 a 100th anniversary jar was released.

During February 2007, Marmite produced a limited edition Guinness Marmite of 300,000 jars of 250 g of their yeast extract with 30% Guinness yeast, giving it a noticeable hint of "Guinness" flavour. During January 2008 Champagne Marmite was released for Valentine's Day, with a limited-edition production of 600,000 units initially released exclusively to Selfridges of London. The product had 0.3% champagne added to the recipe, and a modified heart-shaped label with "I love you" in place of the logo.

During 2009, a limited edition Marston's Pedigree Marmite was initiated to celebrate the 2009 Ashes Cricket test series.

During March 2010, a "super-strength" version of Marmite was released, called Marmite XO (XO standing for "extra old"). Marmite XO is matured for 28 days, four times longer than usual. The original Marmite XO's cap was black, and has a black and gold label. In July 2019, Marmite XO returned due to popular demand. The 2019 version has an off-white cap as opposed to the original black.

During April 2012, a special-edition jar in commemoration of the Diamond Jubilee of Queen Elizabeth II was released. With the product renamed "Ma'amite," the redesigned label featured a colour scheme based upon the Union Jack; the marmite and spoon logo replaced by a gold crown, and with a red rather than yellow cap. The front label also declares "Made with 100% British Yeast". Coinciding with the 110th anniversary of the brand, production was limited to 300,000 jars. For Christmas 2012 a gold limited edition was begun, containing edible gold-coloured flecks.

Marmite chocolate is also available.

During 2015, Marmite Summer of Love Special Edition featured a flower power-themed label. This special edition's blend had a lighter taste made using 100% lager yeast.

On 25 March 2019, Marmite Peanut Butter was introduced, which (as the title implied) combined the taste of Marmite with that of crunchy peanut butter.

On 2 May 2022, Marmite Truffle was launched and sold exclusively in Sainsburys. It was marketed with a variation of the 'Love it Or Hate It' slogan designed to make it sound more sophisticated: "One either loves it or considers it utterly vulgar".

See also

 
 Ambient food
 Cenovis
 Guinness Yeast Extract
 List of spreads
 Lees (fermentation)
 Marmite (New Zealand)
 Nutritional yeast
 Promite
 Twiglets

References

External links

 

Brand name condiments
British condiments
Food brands of the United Kingdom
Food paste
Products introduced in 1902
Umami enhancers
Unilever brands
Vegan cuisine
Yeast extract spreads